Hubert Köstinger (30 April 1914 – 1975) was an Austrian skier. He competed in the Nordic combined event at the 1936 Winter Olympics.

References

External links
 

1914 births
1975 deaths
Austrian male Nordic combined skiers
Olympic Nordic combined skiers of Austria
Nordic combined skiers at the 1936 Winter Olympics
Place of birth missing